Argyrodiaptomus neglectus is a species of crustacean in the family Diaptomidae. It is endemic to Brazil.

References

Diaptomidae
Freshwater crustaceans of South America
Arthropods of Brazil
Endemic fauna of Brazil
Crustaceans described in 1938
Taxonomy articles created by Polbot